Bryan Township may refer to:

 Bryan Township, Boone County, Arkansas
 Bryan Township, Thurston County, Nebraska
 Bryan Township, Surry County, North Carolina

Township name disambiguation pages